Clianthus puniceus, common name kaka beak (Kōwhai Ngutu-kākā in Māori), is a species of flowering plant in the genus Clianthus of the legume family Fabaceae, native to New Zealand's North Island.

Description 
Clianthus puniceus is an evergreen shrub, one of two species of Clianthus, both of which have striking clusters of red, tubular flowers resembling the beak of the kākā, a New Zealand parrot. The plant is also known as parrot's beak, parrot's bill and lobster claw. There is also a variety with white to creamy coloured flowers. Not only does the species have striking red flowers, but it also has foliage which are often similar to those seen on tourist souvenirs and exemplify the New Zealand flora.

Not to be confused with C. maximus that has glossy leaves, the leaves of C. puniceus are matte, due to its cuticle having a dense reticulum of buttressed ridges on the adaxial surface. It has pinnate leaves, and 6–8 cm long raceme flowers. The flowers have an upright petal, two wing petals that are lateral, ad a downward keel petal.

Populations of Clianthus puniceus in the wild are rare and are only composed of a few plants. They can be found on cliffs, bluffs, or margins of bodies of water.

The Latin specific epithet puniceus refers to the reddish-purple colour of the flowers.

Reproduction 
Clianthus puniceus are perfect flowers with a superior ovary and 10 stamens. It usually flowers from spring through to early summer, but can flower twice a year or even year round, and the amount of flowering vary each year.

The species has a cuticle that covers it's stigma from early bud until flower for protection, and inhibits pollination when intact. Pollination can only occur with the rupture of the cuticle, which occurs naturally at flower senescence. It has however been found that it does rupture frequently prior to senescence.  The cuticle is beneficial as it protects against as self-pollination and increases the changes of cross- pollination. However, even though a cross-pollination system is present, the observed small gene pool suggests that self-pollination occurs most often and is prevalent. This inbreeding could cause issues regarding localized bottlenecks as it's occurring in small populations.

When the time comes for self-pollination, the anthers dehisce, and the pollen naturally moves towards the stigma at the top of the keel. This gravitation is due to the pendulous nature of the flower.

It has been found that C. puniceus is mainly bird-pollinated. Even though the flowers don't have much scent for attraction, they contain nectar which attracts many birds such as hummingbirds.

Seed dispersal and dormancy 
The seeds of C. puniceus are kidney-shaped with a mean weight of 0.016 g. Their hard seed coats protect the seeds as they are initially dispersed by gravity, either falling from the pods or still strongly attached to the pods by a mat of dense white hairs. Both the seeds and the pods will float in water, where secondary dispersal can occur. Wind also may disperse the seed, helped in part due to the pod's fiat, sail-like shape when dry.

Indirect evidence suggests that seeds can remain viable in soil for at least 29 years, but this evidence in inconclusive.

In natural populations, seedlings mostly occurred on steep banks or cliffs, directly beneath the flora and fauna of already established plants. Due to the these steep locations, it is possible that dispersal by gravity could occur to place seedlings in unoccupied habitat; despite this, seedling mortality was high.

C. puniceus has been in decline over the past century; however, this is not attributed to the absence of viable seed, as seed production in the wild can be quite high.

Fruit 
Just like the fruits of all other members of the Fabaceae family, C. puniceus has fruits that are legumes, and formed from a single carpel. As well the three distinctive tissue layers of the fruit consist of the endocarp, mesocarp, and exocarp.

Specifically, a distinctive feature of the C. puniceus fruit  includes a very thick mesocarp that can have up to 36 layers of parenchyma cells. As well, long fibres that are aligned with the longitudinal axis of the fruit average to 0.86 mm which can also be distinctive.

Pests and parasites 

C. puniceus plays host to the endemic leaf mining fly Liriomyza clianth.

Secondly, C. puniceus is also a host to Epiphyas postvittana, which is also known as the light brown apple moth. It is native to Australia and was distributed to New Zealand in the 1800s. The moth has the ability to damage the host, and have a negative environmental impact outside of its native area.

Conservation status 
The species is currently listed as endangered  by the IUCN and is very rare to find in the wild. Therefore it is at great risk of becoming extinct, and without change in threats to the species, survival of the species is difficult. Therefore to stop such an extinction action is needed to restore both the habitat, as well as the declining populations of the species.

There are various threats to wild C. puniceus populations. These include, but are not limited to general loss of habitat, competition for space and establishment, as well as introduced herbivores who feed on them. The specific effect of humans on the population of C. puniceus should also be noted. Through seed collection, destruction of habitat, as well as introduction of invasive species, humans have contributed to the decline of the population. However, not all contributions are recognized as negative as lots of cultivation, propagation, and building of new habitats by humans have helped the survival of the species so far.

Currently the distribution of the species in the wild is limited to "the eastern North Island of New Zealand, in the East Coast, northern Hawke's Bay and southern Te Urewera regions"  However, it was also rediscovered in a site north of Auckland recently.

Cultivation 
Clianthus puniceus is widely cultivated today, and is interestingly one of the "first endemic plants to be grown in cultivation both in New Zealand and overseas". Due to the plant's striking flowers and form, seeds were sent from the gardens of Europeans in New Zealand overseas and to various parts of the world including California and England. Today, the plant is still cultivated in various parts of Europe.

Even though in New Zealand C.puniceus was previously widely grown as a garden plant, it has generally been replaced by the more robust Clianthus maximus. However, it is cultivated in the UK, where it has given rise to several cultivars. Both the species and the cultivar ‘Roseus’ have gained the Royal Horticultural Society’s Award of Garden Merit (confirmed 2017).

Gallery

References

External links
ARKive - images and movies of the Kaka beak (Clianthus puniceus)
Kaka beak photos

Galegeae
Trees of New Zealand
Endangered flora of New Zealand
Plants described in 1835